Andy Mulligan may refer to:
* Andy Mulligan (author), English writer
 Andy Mulligan (rugby union) (1936–2001), Irish rugby player